is a Brazilian mixed martial artist who currently competes in the Welterweight division for Bellator MMA. As of December 13, 2022, he is #5 in the Bellator Welterweight Rankings.

Background
Yamauchi was born in Anjō, Aichi to a Japanese father and a Japanese-Brazilian mother, but his family moved to Curitiba, Paraná when he was 3 years old. He started in Brazilian jiu-jitsu at the age of 9, followed by Muay Thai, boxing and wrestling during his youth. At the age of 14, he became Paraná State's amateur boxing champion in 2007, defeating then-reigning champion John Lineker, who was 17.

Mixed martial arts career

Early career
Before moving to professional mixed martial arts, Yamauchi scored seven wins as an amateur, with seven first-round stoppages. Yamauchi started his professional career in 2010, when he was just 17 years old. From October 2010 to May 2013, he fought for many organizations throughout Brazil and won a featherweight title and a featherweight tournament in Iron Fight Combat and Smash Fight respectively.

In January 2013, it was announced that Yamauchi signed a multi-fight contract with Bellator MMA.

Bellator MMA
Yamauchi made his promotional debut against fellow promotional newcomer Musa Toliver on September 13, 2013 at Bellator 99.  He won via submission due to a rear-naked choke early in the first round.

In his second fight for the promotion, Yamauchi faced Saul Almeida on November 22, 2013 at Bellator 109. He won via knockout in the first round.

Yamauchi faced Will Martinez in the quarterfinal match of Bellator season ten featherweight tournament on February 28, 2014 at Bellator 110. He lost the fight via unanimous decision.

Yamauchi faced Mike Richman on May 17, 2014 at Bellator 120. He won the back-and-forth fight via unanimous decision.

Yamauchi faced Martin Stapleton on September 19, 2014 at Bellator 125. He won via submission in the first round.

Yamauchi was expected to face former Bellator Featherweight Champion Pat Curran at Bellator 139 on June 26, 2015. However, Yamauchi pulled out of the fight due to injury and was replaced by Emmanuel Sanchez.

Yamauchi faced Isao Kobayashi at Bellator 144 on October 23, 2015. Yamauchi dominated the fight on the ground for the first two rounds, before defeating his opponent via submission in the third, after dropping Kobayashi with a punch and securing a rear-naked choke. With the win, Yamauchi became the first to finish Isao Yobayashi.

Yamauchi next faced fellow prospect, Bubba Jenkins, at Bellator 151 on March 4, 2016. Early in the first round, Yamauchi was able to secure Jenkins' back standing, remaining there for rest of the round. However, in the next two rounds, Jenkins utilised his superior wrestling to take Yamauchi down and control the fight en route to a unanimous verdict.

Move up to lightweight division
Yamauchi faced Ryan Couture at Bellator 162 on October 21, 2016. He won the fight via submission just over a minute into the first round and became the first fighter to submit Couture.

Yamauchi faced Valeriu Mircea at Bellator 168 on December 10, 2016. After a near knockout loss, Yamauchi defeated Mircea via a triangle choke submission in the first round.

Yamauchi faced Adam Piccolotti at Bellator 183 on September 23, 2017. He won the fight via submission in the first round.

Yamauchi next faced Michael Chandler at Bellator 192 on January 20, 2018. He lost the fight by unanimous decision.

Yamauchi faced Saad Awad at Bellator 229 on October 4, 2019. He won the fight via a verbal submission due to an armbar in the first round.

Yamauchi faced Daron Cruickshank at Bellator & Rizin: Japan on December 29, 2019. He won the fight via a rear-naked choke submission in the first round.

Yamauchi was next expected to face PFL veteran Nate Andrews at Bellator 254 on December 10, 2020. However at weigh ins, Goiti weighed in at 162.8 lbs, 6.8 lbs over the lightweight limit. Mohegan Sun commission head, Mike Mazzulli, said that from now on Yamauchi will be required to fight at Welterweight, 170 lbs.

Yamauchi faced Dan Moret on April 9, 2021 at Bellator 256. He lost the bout via a controversial split decision, where 9/9 media members scored the fight for Yamauchi.

Yamauchi faced Chris Gonzalez on July 31, 2021 at Bellator 263. He won the bout via TKO in the first round, only the second knockout win in Goiti's career.

Yamauchi was scheduled to face Derek Anderson on March 12, 2022 at Bellator 276. The week of the event, the bout was scrapped for unknown reasons.

Move up to welterweight
Moving up to Welterweight, Yamauchi faced Levan Chokheli on April 23, 2022 at Bellator 279. He won the bout via armbar in the first round.

Yamauchi headlined Bellator 284 on August 12, 2022 against fellow BJJ expert Neiman Gracie. He won the bout in the second round after knocking out Gracie with an uppercut.

Yamauchi faced Michael Page on March 10, 2023 at Bellator 292. He lost the bout 26 seconds into the bout after a leg kick ruptured his  patella tendon.

Championships and accomplishments

Mixed martial arts
 Bellator MMA
Most submission wins in Bellator MMA history (nine)
Tied for most submission wins in Bellator Lightweight division history (five)
First fighter in Bellator MMA history to earn wins in three weight classes
First fighter in Bellator MMA history to earn stoppages in three weight classes
 Iron Fight Combat
 Iron Fight Combat featherweight title (One time)
 Smash Fight
 Smash Fight featherweight tournament winner (2013)

Amateur boxing
 Paraná State Amateur Boxing Championship (2007)

Mixed martial arts record

|-
|Loss
|align=center|28–6
|Michael Page
|TKO (leg kick)
|Bellator 292
|
|align=center|1
|align=center|0:26
|San Jose, California, United States
|
|-
|Win
|align=center|28–5
|Neiman Gracie
|KO (punches)
|Bellator 284
|
|align=center|2
|align=center|3:58
|Sioux Falls, South Dakota, United States
|
|-
|Win
|align=center|27–5
| Levan Chokheli
| Submission (armbar)
| Bellator 279
| 
| align=center|1
| align=center|3:49
| Honolulu, Hawaii, United States
| 
|-
|Win
|align=center|26–5
|Chris Gonzalez
|TKO (punches)
|Bellator 263
|
|align=center|1
|align=center|3:53
|Los Angeles, California, United States
|
|-
|Loss
|align=center|25–5
|Dan Moret
|Decision (split)
|Bellator 256 
|
|align=center|3
|align=center|5:00
|Uncasville, Connecticut, United States 
|
|-
|Win
|align=center|25–4
|Daron Cruickshank
|Submission (rear-naked choke)
|Bellator & Rizin: Japan
|
|align=center| 1
|align=center| 3:11
|Saitama, Japan
|
|-
|Win
|align=center|24–4
|Saad Awad
|Verbal submission (armbar)
|Bellator 229
|
|align=center| 1
|align=center| 1:40
|Temecula, California, United States
|
|-
|Win
|align=center|23–4
|Daniel Weichel
|Decision (split)
|Bellator 210
|
|align=center|3
|align=center|5:00
|Thackerville, Oklahoma, United States
|
|-
|Loss
|align=center|22–4
|Michael Chandler 
|Decision (unanimous)
|Bellator 192
|
|align=center|3
|align=center|5:00
|Inglewood, California, United States
|
|-
|Win
|align=center|22–3
|Adam Piccolotti 
|Submission (rear-naked choke)
|Bellator 183
|
|align=center|1
|align=center|3:19
|San Jose, California, United States
|
|-
| Win
| align=center | 21–3
| Valeriu Mircea
| Submission (triangle choke)
| Bellator 168
| 
| align=center | 1
| align=center | 3:33
| Florence, Italy
|
|-
| Win
| align=center | 20–3
| Ryan Couture
| Submission (armbar)
| Bellator 162
| 
| align=center | 1
| align=center | 1:01
| Memphis, Tennessee, United States
| 
|-
| Loss
| align=center | 19–3
| Bubba Jenkins
| Decision (unanimous)
| Bellator 151
| 
| align=center | 3
| align=center | 5:00
| Thackerville, Oklahoma, United States
|
|-
| Win
| align=center | 19–2
| Isao Kobayashi
| Submission (rear-naked choke)
| Bellator 144
| 
| align=center | 3
| align=center | 3:50
| Uncasville, Connecticut, United States
|
|-
| Win
| align=center | 18–2
| Martin Stapleton
| Submission (rear-naked choke)
| Bellator 125
| 
| align=center | 1
| align=center | 4:37
| Fresno, California, United States
|
|-
| Win
| align=center | 17–2
| Mike Richman
| Decision (unanimous)
| Bellator 120
| 
| align=center | 3
| align=center | 5:00
| Southaven, Mississippi, United States
|
|-
| Loss
| align=center | 16–2
| Will Martinez
| Decision (unanimous)
| Bellator 110
| 
| align=center | 3
| align=center | 5:00
| Uncasville, Connecticut, United States
| 
|-
| Win
| align=center | 16–1
| Saul Almeida
| KO (punches)
| Bellator 109
| 
| align=center | 1
| align=center | 2:04
| Bethlehem, Pennsylvania, United States
| 
|-
| Win
| align=center | 15–1
| Musa Toliver
| Submission (rear-naked choke)
| Bellator 99
| 
| align=center | 1
| align=center | 1:01
| Temecula, California, United States
|
|-
| Win
| align=center | 14–1
| Sergio Silva Rodrigues
| Submission (rear-naked choke)
| Smash Fight
| 
| align=center | 1
| align=center | 3:38
| Curitiba, Paraná, Brazil
| 
|-
| Win
| align=center | 13–1
| Diego Marlon
| Submission (armbar)
| Smash Fight
| 
| align=center | 1
| align=center | 2:54
| Curitiba, Paraná, Brazil
| 
|-
| Win
| align=center | 12–1
| Jurandir Sardinha
| Decision
| Iron Fight Combat 3
| 
| align=center | 3
| align=center | 5:00
| Feira de Santana, Bahia, Brazil
| 
|-
| Win
| align=center | 11–1
| José Ivanildo Lopes
| Decision (unanimous)
| Iron Fight Combat 2
| 
| align=center | 3
| align=center | 5:00
| Aracaju, Sergipe, Brazil
|
|-
| Win
| align=center | 10–1
| Gustavo Wurlitzer
| Submission (rear-naked choke)
| Power Fight Extreme 8
| 
| align=center | 1
| align=center | 1:19
| Curitiba, Paraná, Brazil
|
|-
| Win
| align=center | 9–1
| Dymitry Damiani
| Submission (rear-naked choke)
| Iron Fight Combat 1
| 
| align=center | 1
| align=center | 1:40
| Feira de Santana, Bahia, Brazil
|
|-
| Win
| align=center | 8–1
| Juliano Wandalen
| Submission (rear-naked choke)
| Shooto Brazil 31
| 
| align=center | 1
| align=center | 0:56
| Brasília, Brazil
|
|-
| Win
| align=center | 7–1
| Edenilson Junior
| Submission (rear-naked choke)
| Nitrix Champion Fight 9
| 
| align=center | 1
| align=center | 1:02
| Itajaí, Santa Catarina, Brazil
|
|-
| Win
| align=center | 6–1
| Jonathan José de Faria
| Submission (armbar)
| Brave FC: Gold Edition
| 
| align=center | 1
| align=center | 1:02
| Curitiba, Paraná, Brazil
|
|-
| Loss
| align=center | 5–1
| Rodrigo Cavalheiro
| Decision (unanimous)
| Adventure Fighters Tournament
| 
| align=center | 3
| align=center | 5:00
| Curitiba, Paraná, Brazil
|
|-
| Win
| align=center | 5–0
| Tiago Sartori
| Submission (rear-naked choke)
| Capital Fight 4
| 
| align=center | 2
| align=center | 1:41
| Brasília, Brazil
|
|-
| Win
| align=center | 4–0
| Arivaldo Lima Silva
| Submission (armbar)
| Brazilian Fight League 12
| 
| align=center | 1
| align=center | 2:56
| Curitiba, Paraná, Brazil
|
|-
| Win
| align=center | 3–0
| Alessandro Martins
| Submission (rear-naked choke)
| Brave FC: Tryouts
| 
| align=center | 1
| align=center | 1:29
| Curitiba, Paraná, Brazil
|
|-
| Win
| align=center | 2–0
| Eduardo Wellington
| Submission
| Brazilian Fight League: Fight Night 1
| 
| align=center | 1
| align=center | N/A
| Curitiba, Paraná, Brazil
|
|-
| Win
| align=center | 1–0
| Andre Pedroso
| Submission (rear-naked choke)
| Gladiators Fighting Championship 2
| 
| align=center | 2
| align=center | 0:31
| Curitiba, Paraná, Brazil
|

See also 

 List of current Bellator fighters
 List of male mixed martial artists

References

1993 births
Living people
People from Anjō
Sportspeople from Curitiba
Naturalized citizens of Brazil
Brazilian practitioners of Brazilian jiu-jitsu
Japanese practitioners of Brazilian jiu-jitsu
People awarded a black belt in Brazilian jiu-jitsu
Brazilian Muay Thai practitioners
Japanese Muay Thai practitioners
Brazilian male mixed martial artists
Japanese male mixed martial artists
Featherweight mixed martial artists
Mixed martial artists utilizing Muay Thai
Mixed martial artists utilizing boxing
Mixed martial artists utilizing wrestling
Mixed martial artists utilizing Brazilian jiu-jitsu
Japanese people of Brazilian descent
Sportspeople from Aichi Prefecture
Japanese emigrants to Brazil